Leche is a surname. Notable people with the surname include:

 James Leche (born by 1518–54), Welsh MP
 Joan Leche (c. 1450 – 1530), English benefactress
 Paul Leche (1857–1938), Justice of the Louisiana Supreme Court
 Richard W. Leche (1898–1965), governor of Louisiana, 1936–1939
 Roger Leche (died 1416), English courtier, MP and Lord High Treasurer
 Thomas Leche (1581–1646), Archdeacon of Wilt
 Wilhelm Leche (1850–1927), Swedish zoologist